The 2018–19 Deodhar Trophy was the 46th edition of the Deodhar Trophy, a List A cricket competition in India. It was contested between three teams selected by the Board of Control for Cricket in India (BCCI). It was played from 23 to 27 October 2018. India C won the tournament by defeating India B by 29 runs in the final.

Squads

Group stage

Points table

Matches

Final

References

2018 in Indian cricket
Professional 50-over cricket competitions
Deodhar Trophy